Daniel Lord Smail (born 5 October 1961) is Frank B. Baird, Jr. Professor of History at Harvard University, he teaches the history of Mediterranean societies between 1100 and 1600 and in special the French city of Marseille. He also studies deep history and History of Debt.   He was a featured speaker at Beyond Belief (2007) @ University of San Diego, sponsored by The Science Network.

References

Living people
1961 births
University of Michigan alumni